Adnan Babajić (born 28 May 1988) is a Bosnian singer and television personality, who came to media attention as the winner of talents show Operacija trijumf, and thus signed a recording contract for an album for foreign market with Universal Music Group.

Life and career

Early life and career (1988–2008)
Babajić was born and raised in Živinice into a Bosniak family. Before taking part in Operacija trijumf, he appeared in many musical show on television. Babajić plays piano, drums and accordion, and cites Bryan Adams and Željko Joksimović as his idols.

Operacija trijumf (2008–09)
The regional reality show for music talents Operacija trijumf began on 29 September 2009 on the B92. As one of only two contestants from Bosnia and Herzegovina, along with early expelled Jasmina Midžić, Babajić was one of the favourites. He was once nominated, after performing "Viva Las Vegas" by Elvis Presley", but beat Milica Majstorović in voting. Babajić won the competition beating Vukašin Brajić in the final and earned a recording contract with Universal Music Group, although his win was controversial. He was criticized for performing folk songs, which is characteristic for folk music talents show Zvezde Granda.

  Plavi orkestar — "Ako su to samo bile laži" with student Jasmina Midžić (Gala 1)
  Laka — "Pokušaj" with Laka (Gala 2)
  Bijelo Dugme — "Tako ti je, mala moja, kad ljubi Bosanac" with student Aleksandar Belov (Gala 3)
  Željko Samardžić — "9000" with Željko Samardžić (Gala 4)
  Zabranjeno pušenje — "Bos ili hadžija" with student Nikola Paunović (Gala 5)
 Bijelo Dugme — "Pristao sam, biću sve što hoće" (Gala 6)
 Elvis Presley — "Viva Las Vegas" (Gala 7)
 Bojan Marović — "Tebi je lako" (Gala 8)
 Bojan Marović — "Više te nema" with Bojan Marović (Gala 9)
 Toše Proeski — "Pratim te" (Gala 10)
 Bijelo Dugme — "Ima neka tajna veza" with student Aleksandar Belov (Gala 11)
 Petar Grašo — "Vera od suvog zlata" with Petar Grašo (Gala 11)
 Vlado Georgiev — "Živim da te nađem" (Gala 12)
 Đavoli — "Stojim na kantunu" / "Sunčan dan" with student Danijel Pavlović (Gala 12)
 Leb i sol — "Skopje" with student Aleksandar Belov (Gala 13)
 Dino Merlin — "Moj je život Švicarska" (Gala 13)
 Gibonni — "Tempera" (Semi-final)
 YU grupa — "Dunavom još šibaju vetrovi" with YU grupa (Semi-final)
 Al Dino — "Kopriva" (Final)
 Toše Proeski — "Pratim te" (Final)
 Bojan Marović — "Tebi je lako" (Final)

Upcoming solo album (2009–present)
Babajić began recording his album for Universal Music Group. He performed on several concerts with other Operacija trijumf contestants, including three concerts in Sava Centar in Belgrade. Babajić then recorded a single "Srce plače" with Serbian singer Kaya.

Discography

Albums
2010: Upcoming compilation of Operacija trijumf contestants
2010: Upcoming solo album

Singles
2009: "Srce plače" (feat. Kaja Ostojić)
2010: "Ne prođe ni jedan dan"

References

External links
Adnan Bajić at the official website of Operacija trijumf

1988 births
Living people
People from Živinice
Bosniaks of Bosnia and Herzegovina
Bosnia and Herzegovina Muslims
21st-century Bosnia and Herzegovina male singers
Bosnia and Herzegovina folk-pop singers